Bjørn Jenssen (born 1959 in Bodø, Norway) is a Norwegian jazz musician (drums), known from a number of recordings, and steady drummer in the band Dance With a Stranger.

Career 
Jenssen started playing drums 1974 in local Bodø bands like "Dynamite Rockers" and "Kjell Bartholsen Band". He relocated to Oslo in 1976, and was engaged in bands like "Saluki", "Paul Weeden Band", Bill Mulholland Quintet, "Susanne Fuhr Band" (1977–79), "Ruphus" (1979), "Chipahua" (1979–81), Jon Eberson Group (1980–87), Jazzpunkensemblet, Dance With a Stranger (two times awarded Spellemannprisen). In addition Jenssen has collaborated with musicians like Bjørn Eidsvåg, Trygve Henrik Hoff, Vazelina Bilopphøggers, Kari Bremnes oand Reidar Larsen.

Discography 

Within Saluki
1977: Saluki (Compendium Records)

With Anita Skorgan
1978: Anita Skorgan (Snowflake)

Within Ruphus
1979: Manmade (Brain)

With Arild Nyquist and Terje Wiik
1980: Epleslang (Octave)

With Trygve Henrik Hoff
1980: Fokti... (RCA Victor)

Within Jon Eberson Group
1981: Jive Talking (CBS Records)
1984: City Visions (CBS Records)
1985: Stories (CBS Records)

With Mikkel Magnus
1981: Mikkel Magnus Ser Rødt (Mariann)

With Prima Vera
1983: Her Kommer Olavs Menn (Sonet Records)

With Beate
1984: Like A River (EMI Music)

With Silhouette
1984: Silhouette (RCA Victor)

Within Chipahua
1984: The Soul Survivors (Hit Records!)

With Bjørn Eidsvåg
1986: Dansere I Natten (Kirkelig Kulturverksted)
1988: Vertigo (Kirkelig Kulturverksted)

Within Dance With a Stranger
1987: Dance with a Stranger (Norsk Plateproduksjon)
1989: To (Norsk Plateproduksjon)
1991: Atmosphere (Norsk Plateproduksjon)
1994: Look What You've Done (Norsk Plateproduksjon)
1994: Unplugged (Norsk Plateproduksjon)
1995: The Best of Dance with a Stranger (Mercury Records)
1998: Happy Sounds (Mercury Records)
2007: Everyone Needs a Friend... The Very Best Of (Mercury Records)

With Vazelina Bilopphøggers
1989: Tempo (Opal Rekords)

Within Jazz-Punk Ensemblet
1993: Live at Rockefeller (Odin Records)

With Kari Bremnes
1994: Gåte Ved Gåte (Kirkelig Kulturverksted)
1997: Månestein (Kirkelig Kulturverksted)
2000: Norwegian Mood (Kirkelig Kulturverksted)

With Terje Nilsen
1996: Sånn (Nord-Norsk Plateselskap)

With Hedge Hog
1997: BRSTL.com (Voices of Wonder Records)

References

External links 
«Stranger»-trommis blir Tahiti-sjef at NRK (in Norwegian)
Dance With A Stranger at Rockipedia.no (in Norwegian)

20th-century Norwegian drummers
21st-century Norwegian drummers
Norwegian jazz drummers
Male drummers
Musicians from Bodø
1959 births
Living people
20th-century drummers
20th-century Norwegian male musicians
21st-century Norwegian male musicians
Male jazz musicians
Jazzpunkensemblet members
Dance with a Stranger (band) members